William Paul Campbell (July 24, 1935 – March 22, 2015) was an American politician and businessman.

Born in Coraopolis, Pennsylvania, Campbell served in the United States Army. He went to Westminster College and Columbia University. In 1959, he moved to California and was an administrative aide for an elementary school district. Campbell lived in Hacienda Heights, California. He served in the California State Assembly from 1966 to 1974 and was a Republican. Campbell then served in the California State Senate from 1976 to 1990 and was Senate Republican Leader from 1979 to 1983. He then became president of the California Manufacturers & Technology Assn. Campbell then moved to Orem, Utah where he died.

Campbell was a Latter-day Saint and got married in the Los Angeles California Temple.

Notes

External links
Join California William P. "Bill" Campbell

Republican Party California state senators
Republican Party members of the California State Assembly
1935 births
2015 deaths
People from Coraopolis, Pennsylvania
People from Hacienda Heights, California
Politicians from Orem, Utah
Columbia University alumni
Westminster College (Pennsylvania) alumni
Latter Day Saints from Pennsylvania
Businesspeople from California
Latter Day Saints from California
20th-century American businesspeople